Donald Kirk Bramlett (October 5, 1962 – February 1, 2023) was an American professional football player who was a defensive tackle for the Minnesota Vikings in the National Football League (NFL). He played college football at University of Memphis.

Bramlett died on February 1, 2023, at the age of 60.

References 

1962 births
2023 deaths
American football defensive tackles
Memphis Tigers football players
Minnesota Vikings players
Players of American football from Memphis, Tennessee